The twelfth season of the American reality television series Food Network Star premiered May 22, 2016 on Food Network. Food Network chefs Bobby Flay and Giada de Laurentiis returned to the series as judges.

This season featured thirteen contestants rather than twelve; the thirteenth contestant, Martita Jara (who originally appeared in the series' eighth season), was chosen via a three-week spin-off series called Comeback Kitchen, where seven former Food Network Star contestants competed for a chance to participate in season 12 of the main series. Comeback Kitchen was hosted by chef Tyler Florence and chef/actress Valerie Bertinelli; and it premiered on May 8, 2016, although it initially became available on demand in some markets in April 2016. This season also continued the inclusion of Star Salvation, a six-week webseries that featured the most recently eliminated contestant competing against the remaining previously eliminated contestants for a chance to re-enter the main Food Network Star competition.

Unlike previous seasons, executives Bob Tuschman and Susie Fogelson did not assist in the judging; nor did chief executive Brooke Johnson appear in the finale to introduce the winner (Tuschman left Food Network and Johnson retired prior to the start of the season).

Contestants

Winner
 Tregaye Fraser – Atlanta, Georgia

Runners-up
 Jernard Wells – Atlanta, Georgia
 Damiano Carrara – Moorpark, California

Eliminated

 Havird Usry – Augusta, Georgia
 Aaron Crumbaugh – Spokane, Washington
  Melissa Pfeister – Los Angeles, California
 Martita Jara – San Diego, California
 Monterey Salka – Nashville, Tennessee
 Rob Burmeister – Staten Island, New York
 Joy Thompson – Thomasville, North Carolina
 Erin Campbell – Woodbury, Minnesota
 Ana Quincoces – Coral Gables, Florida
 Yaku Moton-Spruill – San Francisco, California

Contestant progress

: Because of the challenge outcome, the judges did not select a winning team.  Instead, they identified the three best individual cooks.
: Yaku returned to the competition after winning Star Salvation.
: Melissa did not appear in the finale.
: Damiano was eliminated from the final three midway through the finale.

 (WINNER) The contestant won the competition and thus became the next Food Network Star.
 (RUNNER-UP) The contestant made it to the finale, but did not win.
 (HIGH) The contestant was one of the selection committee's favorites for that week.
 (IN) The contestant performed well enough to move on to the next week.  
 (LOW) The contestant was one of the selection committee's least favorites for that week, but was not eliminated.
 (OUT) The contestant was the selection committee's least favorite for that week, and was eliminated.

Comeback Kitchen contestants

Contestant progress

: Chris was eliminated after the mentor challenge.
 (WIN) The chef won Comeback Kitchen and returned to the main competition.
 (IN) The contestant performed well enough to move on to the next week.  
 (LOW) The contestant was one of the selection committee's least favorites for that week, but was not eliminated.
 (OUT) The contestant was the selection committee's least favorite for that week, and was eliminated.

Star Salvation
This season of Star Salvation was hosted by Iron Chef Alex Guarnaschelli and season 11 winner Eddie Jackson.

Contestant progress

 (WIN) The chef won Star Salvation and returned to the main competition.
 (IN) The chef continued in the competition.
 (OUT) The chef lost in that week's Star Salvation and was eliminated from the competition.

References

External links
 
 

2016 American television seasons
Food Network Star